Bukowskis is a Scandinavian fine art and antique auction house established in 1870 by the Polish nobleman Henryk Bukowski in Stockholm, Sweden. In 1979, an office was opened in Helsinki, Finland. In 1991, Göran Gustafsson Kapital AB bought Bukowskis. The auction firm was sold 16-years later to the Lundin family in 2007.

The first major sale took place in 1873 and included one of King Karl XV's collections. One of the auction house's most spectacular auctions in the early 20th century was held after the great collector Christian Hammer, when parts of his collection were sold in five auctions.

In January 2022, Bukowskis was acquired by Bonhams for an undisclosed sum.

References

External links
Bukowskis
Bukowskis Market

Swedish auction houses
Companies based in Stockholm
Retail companies established in 1870
Purveyors to the Court of Sweden
Swedish companies established in 1870